The Pedlars Act 1871 (34 & 35 Vict c 96) is an Act of the Parliament of the United Kingdom. This Act, and an amendment in the Pedlars Act 1881, applies to the United Kingdom,  and provides legislation governing pedlar's certificates and the peddling trade.

Pedlars Act 1871 and Pedlars Act 1881 
The Pedlars Act 1871 requires pedlars to apply to the Chief Constable of their local police force for a pedlar's certificate. Trading as a pedlar without a certificate is an offence.

The Pedlars Act 1871 defines a pedlar as a person who trades by travelling on foot between town to town or visits another persons' house. The Act specifically exempts certain traders from being covered by the law, people selling at legitimate markets and fairs, those only seeking customer orders, and  sellers of vegetables, fruit, or victuals. The Pedlars Act 1871 limited the validity of the certificate to the geographical area covered by the issuing police force, so a pedlar needed to apply for another certificate to trade in a different area. The Pedlars Act 1881 amended the 1871 Act by making a pedlar's certificate valid throughout the United Kingdom.

Applying for a Pedlar's Certificate 
An application for a pedlar's certificate is made to a police Chief Constable. The procedure is that the person must attend at a police station in the area they live. The criteria for issuing a certificate is that the person must have resided in the local authority area for at least 28 days and be over 17 years old. An applicant requires a photograph, proof of identity and address, and the details of a referee. The certificate is valid for 1 year.  In 2018, the application fee is £12.25.

Trading without a certificate or allowing somebody else to use it is an offence with a maximum penalty of a fine up to £200. Providing false information when applying for a certificate, or making or carrying a forged certificate is an offence with the maximum penalty of up to 6 months imprisonment. The Police still enforce the Act, for example, in 2017 the Derbyshire police seized the goods of a pedlar trading without a certificate.

Debates about the  Pedlars Act 1871 
Various calls have been made to reform the pedlar laws. In 2012, the Department for Business Innovation and Skills considered reforming the pedlar laws but considered it a matter for a decision at a later date.  The Association of Town & City Management say the current pedlar laws causes one of most complex problems about on-street trading. Local shopkeepers and retailers view peddling as undesirable and unfair competition. Argued is that pedlars are not restricted where they trade and can legitimately stand outside a shop and sell the same goods as it, they cause congestion on the streets in certain city centres, and are  less accountable for any counterfeit or substandard good sold by them.

Since 1999, pedlars have raised concerns about the attempt of some local government authorities to pass Private Acts to circumnavigate the current  pedlar legislation and restrict their trade, for example, by enacting the City of Westminster Act 1999, and Maidstone Borough Council Act 2006.

See also 
 Merchant
 Peddler
 Retail
 Street Trading Licence

References

External links
 Pedlar Information and Resource Center

Law of the United Kingdom
United Kingdom company law
Acts of the Parliament of the United Kingdom concerning England and Wales
United Kingdom Acts of Parliament 1871